The Corleonesi Mafia clan was a faction within the Corleone family of the Sicilian Mafia, formed in the 1970s. Notable leaders included Luciano Leggio, Salvatore Riina, Bernardo Provenzano, and Leoluca Bagarella.

Corleonesi affiliates were not restricted to mafiosi of Corleone. During the Second Mafia War in the early 1980s, the Corleonesi clan opposed the faction of the Palermitans represented, among others, by Gaetano Badalamenti, Stefano Bontate and Salvatore Inzerillo. The victory of the Corleonesi, and in particular the rise of Totò Riina, marked a new era in the history of the Sicilian Mafia. Between 1992 and 1993, the Corleonesi initiated a season of attacks against the state, followed by the State-Mafia Pact.

History

Beginnings
In February 1971, the Corleonesi clan's first boss, Luciano Leggio, ordered the kidnapping for extortion of Antonino Caruso, son of the industrialist Giacomo Caruso, and also that of the son of the builder Francesco Vassallo in Palermo. Leggio was linked to the murder of the General Attorney of Sicily, Pietro Scaglione, who was shot dead on 5 May 1971 with his police bodyguard Antonino Lo Russo. He became a fugitive, and was finally captured in Milan on 16 May 1974. He was sentenced to life imprisonment in 1975. By the end of the 1970s, his lieutenant Salvatore Riina, who was also a fugitive, was in control of the Corleonesi clan.

The Corleonesi's primary rivals were Stefano Bontade, Salvatore Inzerillo and Tano Badalamenti, bosses of various powerful Palermo Mafia families. Between 1981 and 1983, Bontade and Inzerillo, together with many associates and members of both their Mafia and blood families, were killed. There were up to a thousand killings during this period as Riina and the Corleonesi, together with their allies, wiped out their rivals. By the end of the war, the Corleonesi were effectively ruling the Mafia, and over the next few years Riina increased his influence by eliminating the Corleonesi's allies, such as Filippo Marchese, Giuseppe Greco and Rosario Riccobono. In February 1980, Tommaso Buscetta fled to Brazil to escape the brewing Second Mafia War instigated by Riina.

Whereas Riina's predecessors had kept a low profile, leading some in law enforcement to question the very existence of the Mafia, Riina ordered the murders of judges, policemen and prosecutors in an attempt to terrify the authorities. A law to create a new offence of Mafia association and confiscate Mafia assets was introduced by Pio La Torre, secretary of the Italian Communist Party in Sicily, but it had been stalled in parliament for two years. La Torre was murdered on 30 April 1982. In May 1982, the Italian government sent Carlo Alberto Dalla Chiesa, a general of the Italian Carabinieri, to Sicily with orders to crush the Mafia. However, not long after arriving, on 3 September 1982, he was gunned down in the city centre with his wife, Emanuela Setti Carraro, and his driver bodyguard, Domenico Russo. In response to public disquiet about the failure to effectively combat the organisation Riina headed, La Torre's law was passed ten days later. On 11 September 1982, Buscetta's two sons from his first wife, Benedetto and Antonio, disappeared, never to be found again, which prompted his collaboration with Italian authorities. This was followed by the deaths of his brother Vincenzo, son-in-law Giuseppe Genova, brother-in-law Pietro and four of his nephews, Domenico and Benedetto Buscetta, and Orazio and Antonio D 'Amico. Buscetta was arrested in Sao Paulo, Brazil once again on 23 October 1983, and extradited to Italy on 28 June 1984. Buscetta asked to talk to the anti-Mafia judge Giovanni Falcone, and began his life as an informant, referred to as a pentito.

Buscetta was the first high-profile Sicilian Mafiosi to become an informant; he revealed that the Mafia was a single organisation led by a Commission, or Cupola (Dome), thereby establishing that the top tier of Mafia members were complicit in all the organisation's crimes. Buscetta helped judges Falcone and Paolo Borsellino achieve significant success in the fight against organized crime that led to 475 Mafia members indicted, and 338 convicted in the Maxi Trial.

In an attempt to divert investigative resources away from Buscetta's key revelations, Riina ordered a terrorist-style atrocity, the 23 December 1984 Train 904 bombing; 17 people were killed and 267 wounded. It became known as the "Christmas Massacre" (Strage di Natale) and was initially attributed to political extremists. It was only several years later, when police stumbled on explosives of the same type as used in Train 904 while searching the hideout of Giuseppe Calò, that it became apparent that the Mafia had been behind the attack.

As part of the Maxi Trial, Riina was given two life sentences in absentia. Riina pinned his hopes on the lengthy appeal process that had frequently set convicted mafiosi free, and he suspended the campaign of murders against officials while the cases went to higher courts. When the convictions were upheld by the Supreme Court of Cassation in January 1992, the council of top bosses headed by Riina reacted by ordering the assassination of Salvatore Lima (on the grounds that he was an ally of Giulio Andreotti), and Giovanni Falcone.

Bombings of 1992–93

On 23 May 1992, Falcone, his wife Francesca Morvillo and three police officers died in the Capaci bombing on highway A29 outside Palermo. Two months later, Borsellino was killed along with five police officers in the entrance to his mother's apartment block by a car bomb in via D'Amelio. Both attacks were ordered by Riina. Ignazio Salvo, who had advised Riina against killing Falcone, was himself murdered on 17 September 1992. The public was outraged, both at the Mafia and also the politicians who they felt had failed adequately to protect Falcone and Borsellino. The Italian government arranged for a massive crackdown against the Mafia in response.

News reports in May 2019, indicated that a Cosa Nostra insider revealed that John Gotti of the Gambino crime family had sent one of their explosives experts to Sicily to work with the Corleonesi. This individual allegedly helped plan the bombing that would kill Falcone. One mafia expert was surprised that the two groups would cooperate because the American Cosa Nostra was affiliated with the rivals of the Corleonesi. But another expert said the joint effort was understandable. "It may be that the Gambinos at a certain point recognised that the Corleonesi had been victorious in the war between rival families in Sicily  ... there is nothing unusual in the traffic of personnel and ideas across the Atlantic ... they were cousin organisations," according to John Dickie, professor of Italian studies at University College London and the author of Mafia Republic – Italy’s Criminal Curse.

Decline
On 15 January 1993, Carabinieri arrested Riina at his villa in Palermo. He had been a fugitive for 23 years. After Riina's capture, a division emerged among the Corleonesi, and a series of bombings occurred by the Corleonesi against several tourist spots on the Italian mainland — the Via dei Georgofili bombing in Florence, Via Palestro massacre in Milan and the Piazza San Giovanni in Laterano and Via San Teodoro in Rome, which left 10 people dead and 93 injured as well as severe damage. In total, Riina was given 26 life sentences, and served his sentence in solitary confinement.

Giovanni Brusca – one of Riina's hitmen who personally detonated the bomb that killed Falcone, and became a state witness (pentito) after his arrest in 1996 – has offered a controversial version of the capture of Totò Riina: a secret deal between Carabinieri officers, secret agents and Cosa Nostra bosses tired of the dictatorship of Riina’s faction of the Corleonesi. According to Brusca, Provenzano "sold" Riina in exchange for the valuable archive of compromising material that Riina held in his apartment in Via Bernini 52 in Palermo.

Some investigators believed that most of those who carried out murders for Cosa Nostra answered solely to Leoluca Bagarella, and that consequently Bagarella actually wielded more power than Bernardo Provenzano, who was Riina's formal successor. Provenzano reportedly protested about the terroristic attacks, but Bagarella responded sarcastically, telling Provenzano to wear a sign saying "I don't have anything to do with the massacres".

On June 24, 1995, Bagarella was arrested, having been a fugitive for four years. In total, Bagarella was given 13 life sentences plus 106 years and ten months, and solitary confinement for 6 years.

Provenzano subsequently took the reins of the Corleonesi. Provenzano had been a fugitive from the law since 1963. Provenzano was finally captured on 11 April 2006, by the Italian police near his home town, Corleone. After the arrest of Provenzano, the power of the Corleonesi was decimated.

Affiliation and power of the Corleonesi
Corleonesi affiliates were not restricted to mafiosi of Corleone. The Corleone Mafia bosses initiated “men of honour”, not necessarily from Corleone, whose status was kept hidden from the other members of the Corleone cosca and other Mafia families. Members of other Mafia families who sided with Riina and Provenzano were called Corleonesi as well, forming a coalition that dominated the Mafia in the 1980s and 1990s, that can be considered as a kind of parallel Cosa Nostra. (Giovanni Brusca from the San Giuseppe Jato Mafia family was considered to be part of the Corleonesi faction for example) 

The pentito (Mafia turncoat) Antonino Calderone provided first-hand accounts of the leaders of the Corleonesi: Luciano Leggio, Totò Riina and Bernardo Provenzano. About Leggio, Calderone said:

"The Corleone bosses were not educated at all, but they were cunning and diabolical," Calderone said about Riina and Provenzano. "They were both clever and ferocious, a rare combination in Cosa Nostra." Calderone described Totò Riina as "unbelievably ignorant, but he had intuition and intelligence and was difficult to fathom and very hard to predict." Riina was soft spoken, highly persuasive and often highly sentimental. He followed the simple codes of the brutal, ancient world of the Sicilian countryside, where force is the only law and there is no contradiction between personal kindness and extreme ferocity. "His philosophy was that if someone’s finger hurt, it was better to cut off his whole arm just to make sure," Calderone said.

Another pentito Leonardo Messina described how the Corleonesi organized their rise to power:

References

Notes

Bibliography
Dickie, John (2004). Cosa Nostra. A history of the Sicilian Mafia, London: Coronet, 
Jamieson, Alison (2000), The Antimafia. Italy’s Fight Against Organized Crime, London: MacMillan Press 
 Lodato, Saverio (1999). Ho ucciso Giovanni Falcone: la confessione di Giovanni Brusca, Milan: Mondadori 
Paoli, Letizia (2003). Mafia Brotherhoods: Organized Crime, Italian Style, Oxford/New York: Oxford University Press 
Stille, Alexander (1995). Excellent Cadavers. The Mafia and the Death of the First Italian Republic, New York: Vintage 

1970s establishments in Italy
2006 disestablishments in Italy
 
Terrorism in Italy